Duncan Walker Bannatyne,  (born 2 February 1949) is a Scottish entrepreneur, philanthropist, and author. His business interests include hotels, health clubs, spas, media, TV, and property. He is most famous for his appearance as a business angel on the BBC programme Dragons' Den. He was appointed an OBE for his contribution to charity. He has written seven books.

Early life

Bannatyne was born in Dalmuir west of Glasgow. His father Bill had served in the Argyll and Sutherland Highlanders in World War II and worked on the Burma Railway after being captured by the Japanese following the Fall of Singapore, he then worked in the foundry at the Clydebank Singer plant. As a child, he lived in one room with his parents and siblings in a large house shared with six other families. 

He attended Dalmuir Primary School where he displayed a talent for arithmetic and won a place at Clydebank High School after passing the Eleven plus exam. Most pupils owned a bicycle so he resolved to earn the money to buy one for himself. The local newsagent was not interested in employing him so she challenged him to find 100 new customers in return for a paper round. He called her bluff by returning with 100 names, but later reflected that it would have been more entrepreneurial to have sold the list. He only enjoyed PE and woodwork at the High School and left at 15 without any qualifications.

In 1964, after a few weeks working for a local cabinet-maker he joined the Royal Navy, initially enlisting for twelve years as a junior second class engineering mechanic (stoker) at RNTE Shotley near Ipswich, better known as the boys' training establishment HMS Ganges. He served in the Navy for several years including a spell on the aircraft carrier HMS Eagle, before throwing an officer off a boat landing jetty in Scotland and receiving a dishonourable discharge. In his autobiography he claims this was in part a reaction to this officer's abuse of his authority, in part a dare by his shipmates and in part a way of getting out of the Navy, with which he had become disillusioned. Bannatyne was nineteen when this happened. After the incident he had to serve nine months in Colchester military detention centre. 

He later spent ten days in Glasgow's Barlinnie prison for not paying a £10 fine in relation to a charge of breach of the peace and resisting arrest.

Career
Bannatyne spent his twenties moving from one job to another. Upon his return to Clydebank he trained as an agricultural vehicle fitter and then travelled around the country repairing tractors. He lived on the island of Jersey for four years from 1974 where he gained an HGV licence and earned a living through several jobs including deckchair attendant, ice cream seller and hospital porter. He also surfed, partied and met his first wife on the island. With Jersey's difficult business climate for outsiders, at age 29, Bannatyne and his wife moved to Stockton-on-Tees in North East England. He has stated that he was poor and did not have a bank account until the age of 30.

His business career began almost immediately after his move to Stockton-on-Tees with an ice cream van purchased for £450. He soon expanded by buying more vans during the period of the Glasgow Ice Cream Wars. 

He sold the business for £28,000, founding a nursing home business called Quality Care Homes which he then sold for £26 million in 1997 and children's nursery chain Just Learning for £12 million. The Just Learning chief executive during the 1992–97 period was Michael Fallon while out of office as an MP.

Bannatyne has since expanded into health clubs, with the Bannatyne Health Club & Spa chain to his name, and also hotels and property. He acquired 26 health clubs from Hilton Hotels in August 2006 at a price of £92 million. The Bannatyne Group is now the largest independent chain of health clubs in the United Kingdom with 71 sites. The business currently (June 2018) has 46 spas with plans for more, including at its first Northern Ireland-based health club in Belfast  and it operates 4 hotels.

His wealth as of 2018, was estimated at £280 million by the Sunday Times Rich List.

Bannatyne has written seven books: Anyone Can Do It, Wake Up and Change Your Life, How to be Smart With Your Money, How to be Smart With Your Time, 43 Mistakes Businesses Make, 37 Questions Everyone in Business Needs to Answer, and Riding The Storm.

Television
From 2005 until 2015, Bannatyne was a Dragon on the BBC television series Dragons' Den. During his time on the show he invested in 36 businesses.

In 2015, Bannatyne took part in the fifteenth series of I'm a Celebrity...Get Me Out of Here!. His fee for taking part in the show was donated to the Operation Smile charity.

In 2020, Bannatyne took part in the BBC series The Real Marigold Hotel. He joined other celebrities including Britt Ekland, Henry Blofeld, John Altman, Susie Blake, and Barbara Dickson.

Charity works
Bannatyne received his OBE partly in recognition for his work with charities such as Mary's meals. He has funded several projects over a ten-year period in Romania, including Casa Bannatyne in Târgu-Mureş, a hospice for orphans with HIV and AIDS in which he invested £80,000. He established the Bannatyne Charitable Trust in March 2008.

On 19 May 2008, Bannatyne added his support to the launch of the Geared for Giving Campaign at the House of Commons to encourage UK business leaders to set up and promote a Workplace Giving scheme to benefit UK registered charities with tax effective donations through employees' pay. He then helped to promote Clydesdale Bank's and Yorkshire Bank's efforts to promote the programme through ATM (Automated Teller Machine) rolls. "They are really going for it, over 20 per cent of their employees are giving money through this system", Bannatyne says.

On 29 August 2008, Bannatyne appeared on television programme Who Wants to Be a Millionaire?, raising £20,000 for charity NCH.

He became President of the charity No Smoking Day in October 2008. The charity runs the annual health awareness campaign – helping people who want to stop smoking. This followed on from him making a documentary about the ethics of British American Tobacco.

In August 2010, he agreed to become Patron of PC David Rathband's Blue Lamp Foundation, a charity established by the Northumbria Police Constable David Rathband, who was blinded by gunshot wounds in the 2010 Northumbria Police manhunt.

Political activity
Bannatyne supported the Conservative Party under Margaret Thatcher, but switched to support New Labour under Tony Blair and Gordon Brown.

On appearing on the Question Time panel on 7 February 2008, he revealed having been a donor to the Labour Party under Blair. He also voiced his support for Brown, but criticised the Cabinet for what he described as "petty squabbles based on personal ambition". In March 2011, Bannatyne appeared to switch political affiliations again, by backing certain measures imposed in Chancellor George Osborne's budget even though he mocked the government a few months earlier.

In April 2015, a week after signing a letter to The Daily Telegraph supporting the Conservative Party in the 2015 General Election, he reversed his position, and pledged his vote to Labour, praising leader Ed Miliband's "courage" in pledging to scrap non-domiciled tax status.

Bannatyne voted for the United Kingdom to leave the European Union in the 2016 referendum on that issue.

Personal life
Bannatyne resides in Portugal, where he married Nigora Whitehorn on 3 June 2017. Bannatyne has four children by his first wife, Gail (m. 1983): Hollie, Abigail, Jennifer and Eve; two with his second wife, Joanne (m. 2006): Emily (b. 1999) and Thomas (b. 2002). He has several grandchildren, including Ava and Austin, from his eldest daughter.

Bannatyne was awarded an honorary doctorate of science by Glasgow Caledonian University on 5 July 2006 for services to business and charity. He was also awarded an honorary doctorate of business administration from Teesside University, on 6 February 2009.

His 60th birthday was celebrated in London, with celebrities including David Coulthard, James Caan, Theo Paphitis, and Anna Ryder Richardson. A second party was held in the North East of England and was headlined by UK soul singer Beverley Knight and featured Chesney Hawkes, with the festivities occurring in a converted warehouse in Darlington, County Durham.

He openly discussed having had cosmetic surgery under his eyes on The Graham Norton Show; had an acting role in the Tyne Tees Television comedy pilot Girl's Club where amongst other actors, he performed alongside the actress Georgia Taylor. In 2011, he stated that he suffers from prosopagnosia, which makes it difficult to recognise familiar faces.

References

External links
 
 
 Interview – April 2010

1949 births
Living people
Royal Navy sailors
Scottish businesspeople
Scottish non-fiction writers
People from Clydebank
People educated at Clydebank High School
Officers of the Order of the British Empire
British Eurosceptics
Labour Party (UK) donors
I'm a Celebrity...Get Me Out of Here! (British TV series) participants